Hamid Mansoor Nagra is a Pakistani former first-class cricketer who played in twenty-three first-class matches for multiple teams between 1961/62 and 1978/79.

Nagra was educated at Government Technical High School, Peoples Colony.

References

Living people
1943 births
Pakistani cricketers
Sargodha cricketers
National Tyre and Rubber Company cricketers
Punjab University cricketers
Cricketers from Faisalabad